The Aveland High School was a secondary-level, co-educational Community School in the Billingborough, a village in the English county of Lincolnshire. The school served pupils aged 11 to 16 before it closed at the end of 2009. The school used a secondary modern style admissions procedure and had a capacity for 438 pupils.

History

Construction
It was built by Foster's of Wharf Road in Grantham. It cost £112,800, with furnishing and equipment costing £18,100. It had 11 acres. The structure was the Thermagard system. The county architect was JWH Barnes. It was designed for around 300 children.

Opening
It opened in January 1963, and officially opened on Tuesday 21 May 1963 by James Heathcote-Drummond-Willoughby, 3rd Earl of Ancaster, the Lord-Lieutenant of Lincolnshire, with the Bishop of Grantham, Anthony Otter. The school had meant to be opened by the government minister Sir Chris Chataway. The head boy was William Creasey.

References 

1963 establishments in England
Defunct schools in Lincolnshire
Educational institutions disestablished in 2009
Educational institutions established in 1963
South Kesteven District
2009 disestablishments in England